The Bi Life is a British dating reality programme. It features bisexual people exploring the dating scene of Barcelona while receiving dating advice and support from each other and host Courtney Act. The show has been noted in media for promoting bisexual visibility.

Cast
The series' main cast was revealed on 9 October 2018, two weeks before the first episode was broadcast.

Episodes
All episodes were originally broadcast on E! in the UK and Ireland, starting from 25 October 2018, before being uploaded to YouTube and hayu.

Viewership

Weekly ratings for each show on E!. All ratings are provided by BARB.

References

External links 
 

2018 British television series debuts
2018 British television series endings
2010s British reality television series
2010s British LGBT-related television series
Bisexuality-related television series
E! original programming
English-language television shows
British dating and relationship reality television series
2010s LGBT-related reality television series